The 2021 Suffolk County Council election took place on 6 May 2021 as part of the 2021 local elections in the United Kingdom. All 75 councillors were elected from 63 electoral divisions, which return either one or two county councillors each, by first-past-the-post voting, for a four-year term of office.

Voters who live in divisions which elect two councillors (12 divisions) are entitled to cast a maximum of two votes, while those living in divisions only electing one councillor (51 divisions) are only entitled to cast one vote.

The council is subject to a Local Government Boundary Commission for England review where it is proposed to reduce the number of councillors from 75 to 70. The recommendations were due to be implemented at this election but has been deferred to the 2025 Suffolk County Council election due to COVID-19 pandemic.

The county saw a marked contrast between its rural and urban areas.  The ruling Conservative administration made 8 gains across Bury St Edmund's, Ipswich and Lowestoft, but lost 5 divisions in rural Suffolk that it had won four years earlier and was traditionally stronger.  The Green Party replaced Labour as the second largest party, and the latter were subsequently relegated to 5 seats.  The Liberal Democrats continued their descent after making losses in 2013 and 2017, with a further loss. The Independents also finished one seat lower than 2017.  With 55 seats, the Conservatives were subsequently returned for a fifth term in office and scored their joint second best number of seats (equalling 2009) since the Council was created in 1973.

Previous composition

2017 election

Composition of council seats before election

Changes between elections

In between the 2017 election and the 2021 election, the following council seats changed hands outside of by-elections:

Overall Results

|-

Results by Electoral Division

Babergh

Summary

Division results

East Suffolk

Division results

Ipswich

Mid Suffolk

West Suffolk

Bixley, Ipswich

Blackbourn, West Suffolk

Blything, East Suffolk

Bosmere, Mid Suffolk

Brandon, West Suffolk

Bridge, Ipswich

Bungay, East Suffolk

Carlford, East Suffolk

-->

Chantry, Ipswich

Clare, West Suffolk

Eastgate & Moreton Hall, West Suffolk

Exning & Newmarket, West Suffolk

Felixstowe Coastal, East Suffolk

Felixstowe North & Trimley, East Suffolk

Framlingham, East Suffolk

Gainsborough, Ipswich

Gipping Valley, Mid Suffolk

Gunton, East Suffolk

Halesworth, East Suffolk

Hardwick, West Suffolk

Hartismere, Mid Suffolk

Haverhill Cangle, West Suffolk

Haverhill East & Kedington, West Suffolk

Hoxne & Eye, Mid Suffolk

Kesgrave & Rushmere St Andrew, East Suffolk

Kessingland & Southwold, East Suffolk

Lowestoft South, East Suffolk

Martlesham, East Suffolk

Mildenhall, West Suffolk

Newmarket & Red Lodge, West Suffolk

Oulton, East Suffolk

Pakefield, East Suffolk

Priory Heath, Ipswich

Row Heath, West Suffolk

Rushmere, Ipswich

St Helen's, Ipswich

St John's, Ipswich

St Margaret's & Westgate, Ipswich

Stowmarket North & Stowupland, Mid Suffolk

Stowmarket South, Mid Suffolk

Thedwastre North, Mid Suffolk

Thedwastre South, Mid Suffolk

Thingoe North, West Suffolk

Thingoe South, West Suffolk

Thredling, Mid Suffolk

Tower, West Suffolk

*Note: Nettleton won a seat standing as an independent at the previous election.

Upper Gipping, Mid Suffolk

Whitehouse & Whitton, Ipswich

Wickham, East Suffolk

Wilford, East Suffolk

Woodbridge, East Suffolk

References

Suffolk
2020s in Suffolk
Suffolk County Council elections